The 1984 season was the Minnesota Vikings' 24th in the National Football League. The Vikings finished with a 3–13 record, their worst record since the AFL–NFL merger, later equaled by the 2011 team, and the team's second worst overall record by win percentage (only 1962 was worse). 

The Vikings' 484 points allowed (30.3 average points per game) was the most by any NFL team between 1983 and 2000, and the most any Vikings team allowed in one season. At the time, it was the third-most allowed in a 16-game season, trailing only the 1981 Baltimore Colts (533, still the record going into the 2021 season) and 1980 New Orleans Saints (487). 

The team was coached by Les Steckel after Bud Grant retired; after the bad season, Steckel was fired and Bud Grant was re-hired.

Offseason

1984 Draft

 The Vikings traded their second- and fourth-round selections (40th and 100th overall) to the Houston Oilers in exchange for quarterback Archie Manning and tight end Dave Casper.
 The Vikings traded their fifth-round selection (127th overall) to the Los Angeles Raiders in exchange for the Raiders' 5th-, 7th- and 11th-round selections (140th, 196th and 308th overall).
 The Vikings were due to pick 322nd overall but Green Bay passed on the 321st pick, allowing the Vikings to move up one spot.

1984 Supplemental USFL/CFL Draft

Preseason

Regular season

Schedule

Game summaries

Week 3: vs Atlanta Falcons

Week 15: at San Francisco 49ers

Standings

Staff

Roster

Statistics

Team leaders

League rankings

References

Minnesota Vikings seasons
Minnesota
Minnesota Vikings